The 2003–04 Ukrainian Hockey League season was the 11th season of the Ukrainian Hockey League, the top level of ice hockey in Ukraine. Thirteen teams participated in the league, and HC Sokol Kyiv won the championship.

First round

Division A

Division B

Group A

Group B

Placing round

5th place
 HK Dniprovski Vovki Dnipropetrovsk - Gladiator Lviv 2:4

3rd place 
 Politekhnik Kyiv - Sonyatschna Dolyna Odessa 2:3

Final
 HK Dnipro Kherson - Meteor Dnipropetrovsk 5:9

Playoffs

Pre-Playoffs 
 Druzhba-78 Kharkiv - Meteor Dnipropetrovsk 3:5/2:1

Semifinals
 HK ATEK Kyiv - Barvinok Kharkiv 2:1
 HK Kyiv - Meteor Dnipropetrovsk 2:0

Qualification 
 HK Kyiv - HK ATEK Kyiv 2:0

Final 
 HC Sokil Kyiv - HK Kyiv 2:0

External links
Ukrainian Ice Hockey Federation 

UKHL
Ukrainian Hockey Championship seasons
Ukr